Belotić or Mačvanski Belotić is a village in Serbia. It is situated in the Bogatić municipality, in the Mačva District. The village has a Serb ethnic majority and the population numbered 1,557 people in a 2011 census.

See also
List of places in Serbia
Mačva

Mačva
Populated places in Mačva District